Rufus Frederik Sewell (born 29 October 1967) is a British film and stage actor. In film, he has appeared in Carrington (1995), Hamlet (1996), Dangerous Beauty (1998), Dark City (1998), A Knight's Tale (2001), The Legend of Zorro (2005), The Illusionist (2006), Amazing Grace (2006), The Holiday (2006), Paris, je t'aime (2006), Judy (2019), The Father (2020), and Old (2021).

On television, he has starred in Middlemarch (1994), Arabian Nights (2000), Charles II: The Power and the Passion (2003), John Adams (2008), Eleventh Hour (2008–2009), Zen (2011), The Pillars of the Earth (2010), Parade's End (2012), Victoria (2016–2017), The Man in the High Castle (2014–2019), and The Marvelous Mrs. Maisel (2019). In 2020, he also had a starring role in the Agatha Christie TV adaptation The Pale Horse.

On stage, he originated the role of Septimus Hodge in Tom Stoppard's Arcadia and the role of Jan in Stoppard's Rock 'n' Roll, with the latter earning him an Olivier Award win and a Tony Award nomination.

Early life
Sewell was born the son of Jo, a Welsh artist and classically trained pianist. His father was William John Frederick Sewell (1924–1978), an Anglo-Australian animator who worked on the “Lucy in the Sky with Diamonds" segment of animation for The Beatles' Yellow Submarine film. His parents divorced when Sewell was five and his father died when he was 10. Sewell's mother subsequently lived at The Pelican, Laugharne, Carmarthenshire, formerly home to the parents of Welsh poet and writer Dylan Thomas. Sewell has said that he was a difficult teenager.

Sewell was educated at Trafalgar Junior School, a state junior school in Twickenham which he left in 1978. Whilst at Trafalgar Junior School he was a member of the drama club and he played the lead in Rumpelstiltskin which he acted on his knees throughout.

Sewell went on to Orleans Park School, a state comprehensive school in Twickenham, which he left in 1984, followed by West Thames College, where a drama teacher sent him to audition for drama school. He later enrolled at the Royal Central School of Speech and Drama in London.

Career
After graduating, Sewell was set up with an agent by Judi Dench, who had directed him in a play while at the Central School of Speech and Drama. His breakthrough year was in 1993, in which he starred as the unpleasant Tim in Michael Winner's film Dirty Weekend. Winner chose him after seeing him in a play at the Criterion Theatre. Also in 1993 Sewell starred in the BBC serial of George Eliot's Middlemarch and on stage in Tom Stoppard's play Arcadia at The Royal National Theatre (Lyttelton). 

His film work includes 1995's Cold Comfort Farm, directed by John Schlesinger, the lead role of John Murdoch in the science fiction film Dark City in 1998, Amazing Grace, The Illusionist and Nancy Meyers' romantic comedy The Holiday. Amazing Grace deals with William Wilberforce's political fight to abolish slavery in Britain, with Sewell playing Wilberforce's co-campaigner Thomas Clarkson. 

Sewell is known for his villainous roles, such as those in A Knight's Tale, The Legend of Zorro, Bless the Child, Helen of Troy and The Illusionist. He spoke of his unhappiness about this, saying that "[I] don't want to play a baddie again." "Everyone has their thing they have to get around," notes Sewell. "With me, it's like okay, how can I make this upper class bad guy in the 19th century different and interesting?"

In 2008, Sewell appeared in the HBO miniseries John Adams as Alexander Hamilton. He received critical praise for his portrayal of Charles II in the BBC's Charles II: The Power and The Passion. The series' cast included Ian McDiarmid, Helen McCrory, Rupert Graves and Shirley Henderson and spanned the life of the king from his last days in exile to his death. 

He co-starred in the controversial film Downloading Nancy, which was released on 5 June 2009. At the Sundance Film Festival in 2008, audiences walked out of the screening. Despite the controversy, Sewell continues to staunchly support the film. "It's a film I'm very proud of, whether you consider that it fails or succeeds, whether you like it or don't like it. I'm proud to be in it." 

Between 2006 & 2009, on BBC Radio, Sewell read Russell Thorndike's stories of Doctor Syn – the adventures of an 18th-century clergyman, adventurer, smuggler and pirate.
Although best known for his work in costume dramas, Sewell prefers "cravat-less" roles in modern pieces, such as the role of Petruchio in the BBC's 2005 version of Shakespeare's The Taming of the Shrew. This was shown as part of the ShakespeaRe-Told series, and the role earned him a Best Actor nomination at the 2006 BAFTA Television Awards. In this modern retelling of the story, the action moves from 17th century Padua, Italy to 21st century London. This production marked the fourth time that Sewell had acted in a work based on a Shakespeare play since becoming a professional actor: he previously portrayed Hotspur in Henry IV, Part 1 in 1995, Fortinbras in Hamlet in 1996 and the title role in Macbeth in 1999. The role also reunited him with his Charles II co-star Shirley Henderson.

He appeared in the premiere and first run of Tom Stoppard's play Rock 'n' Roll at the Royal Court Theatre from June to July 2006 and at the Duke of York's Theatre from July until November 2006. The play was a critical and commercial success, playing to full houses and collecting several awards and nominations, including wins for Sewell in the Best Actor category at The Evening Standard Awards, The Critics' Circle Awards and The Olivier Awards.

He has recorded eleven of Ian Fleming's James Bond books on 36 CDs for Collins. He continues to work in film, television and theatre, playing the lead role of Dr. Jacob Hood in the CBS TV series Eleventh Hour. He finished filming in November 2009 for the miniseries The Pillars of the Earth, which was shown on TV in 2010. 

In 2010, he played the Italian detective Aurelio Zen, based on the best-selling novels by Michael Dibdin, for the BBC One drama series Zen. The three episodes were filmed in Rome and shown on BBC One in early January 2011. The series was cancelled by the BBC after just one season. He also had a small part in the film The Tourist, which also starred Angelina Jolie and Johnny Depp and was released in cinemas in 2010. He played the lead vampire, Adam, in the film Abraham Lincoln: Vampire Hunter, which was filmed in New Orleans and released in June 2012.

Sewell played the role of Ethics Man in Darkside, Tom Stoppard's 2013 radio drama based on Pink Floyd's album The Dark Side of the Moon. Sewell co-starred with Dwayne Johnson, as Autolycus, in the film Hercules, which was released in July 2014. In 2015, Sewell voiced the role of Sir Claude, a feral cat, in Blinky Bill the Movie. Sewell has most recently appeared as high-ranking American-turned-Nazi official John Smith in The Man in the High Castle, and as Lord Melbourne in Victoria.

In February 2023, it was announced that Sewell had been cast as Prince Andrew in Scoop, a Netflix drama about Andrew's 2019 Newsnight interview, co-starring Gillian Anderson as Emily Maitlis, Billie Piper and Keeley Hawes.

Personal life
Sewell has been married twice. His first wife was his long-term girlfriend, Australian fashion journalist Yasmin Abdallah; they were married in 1999 and divorced in 2000. He married his second wife, scriptwriter and producer Amy Gardner, in 2004. They have a son, William Douglas Sewell (born 2002), and divorced in 2006. Sewell also has a daughter, Lola (born 2013), with Ami Komai.

Filmography

Film

Television

Stage

Awards and nominations

References

External links

 

Rufus Sewell on the British Film Institute
Rufus Sewell news and commentary on  The Guardian

1967 births
20th-century English male actors
21st-century English male actors
Male actors from London
Alumni of the Royal Central School of Speech and Drama
English male film actors
English people of Australian descent
English people of Welsh descent
English male stage actors
English male television actors
Laurence Olivier Award winners
Living people
People educated at Orleans Park School
Actors from Twickenham
English male Shakespearean actors
Welsh–English translators
20th-century translators
21st-century translators
Blinky Bill